William Ellery Sr. (31 October 1701 – 15 March 1764) was a merchant and politician in the Colony of Rhode Island and Providence Plantations during the mid-18th century.

Biography
He was the third of nine children born to the Hon. Benjamin Ellery and Abigail Wilkins of Gloucester and Bristol, Massachusetts, and Newport, Rhode Island.   He graduated from Harvard College in 1722, and in the same year was married to Elizabeth Almy, the daughter of Job Almy and Ann Lawton of Newport.  He became a wealthy merchant in Newport, and in time served in a number of civic capacities.  From 1738 to 1740 he served as a Newport Justice of the Inferior Court of Common Pleas and General Sessions of the Peace.  He later served as an assistant and Deputy Governor of the colony.

William and Elizabeth had six children, four of whom grew to maturity.  His second son, William Ellery, became a prominent Newport lawyer, was a member of the Continental Congress, and one of Rhode Island's two signers of the United States Declaration of Independence.

See also

 List of lieutenant governors of Rhode Island
 List of colonial governors of Rhode Island

References

Bibliography

Further reading

External links
State list of lieutenant governors of Rhode Island

1701 births
1764 deaths
Harvard College alumni
Politicians from Newport, Rhode Island
People of colonial Rhode Island
People from Bristol, Rhode Island
American merchants
Businesspeople from Rhode Island